Carlos Fernandes Esteves de Almeida (also Carlos Almeida, born 4 August 1988) is a Portuguese swimmer, who specializes in breaststroke events. He is a two-time Olympian, an NCAA Champion, a 2011 Big East Conference champion, and a current Portuguese record holder in the 50, 100 and 200 m breaststroke in the long and short course. Almeida is a resident athlete for Amadora Swimming Club in Lisbon, and is coached and trained by Filipe Coelho.

Almeida made his official debut at the 2008 Summer Olympics in Beijing, where he competed in the men's 200 m breaststroke. He cleared a FINA B-cut of 2:15.00 from the Dutch Open in Eindhoven, Netherlands. Almeida blasted a 2:15 barrier and a new Portuguese record of 2:13.34 to top the second heat, but he finished only in thirty-second overall from the preliminaries.

At the 2012 Summer Olympics in London, Almeida qualified for the men's 100 m breaststroke by establishing a Portuguese record and achieving a FINA B-standard entry time of 1:01.19 from the European Championships in Debrecen, Hungary. He challenged seven other swimmers on the third heat, including fellow two-time Olympian Martin Liivamägi of Estonia. He raced to third place by two tenths of a second (0.20) behind Greece's Panagiotis Samilidis in 1:01.40. Almeida failed to advance into the semifinals, as he placed twenty-fifth overall out of 44 swimmers on the first day of preliminaries.

Almeida was a member of the swimming team for the Louisville Cardinals, with a sports administration major at the University of Louisville in Louisville, Kentucky. Almeida also became the first swimmer in school's history to claim a title at the NCAA Division I Championships in Federal Way, Washington. He blasted a time of 1:51.88 in the 200 breast stroke to match former Olympic silver medalist Ed Moses for the fourth-fastest all time in collegiate history.

References

External links
Player Bio – Louisville Cardinals
NBC Olympics Profile

1988 births
Living people
Portuguese male breaststroke swimmers
Olympic swimmers of Portugal
Swimmers at the 2008 Summer Olympics
Swimmers at the 2012 Summer Olympics
Louisville Cardinals men's swimmers
Swimmers from Lisbon
20th-century Portuguese people
21st-century Portuguese people